Elvis and Gladys is a biography of rock and roll singer Elvis Presley by author and film industry insider, Elaine Dundy. The book recounts Presley's early life, the role his mother Gladys played in his formative years, and his beginnings in recorded music and film.

Hardcover edition published in the United States in 1985 by  MacMillan Publishing Company, New York. . It was reissued in paperback in 2004 by the University Press of Mississippi.

Widely acclaimed, the Boston Globe called it "Nothing less than the best Elvis book yet" and Kirkus Reviews, "The most fine-grained Elvis bio ever."

The biopic which depicted Elvis' relationship with Gladys is featured in the TV series Elvis (2005), which starred Jonathan Rhys Meyers as Elvis and Camryn Manheim as Gladys.

Dundy in the book claims that Elvis's great-great grandmother Nancy Burdine Tacket was Jewish, citing one of Elvis's third cousins, Oscar Tackett.

References

External links
Elvis and Gladys by Elaine Dundy. New York, Macmillan, 1985 at Internet Archive   
Elvis and Gladys by Elaine Dundy description at University Press of Mississippi site [May 2004]
Elvis and Gladys by Elaine Dundy current  description at University Press of Mississippi site 
Elaine Dundy website

1985 non-fiction books
American biographies
Biographies about musicians
Books about Elvis Presley